Alan Whitehead (born 1950) is a British Member of Parliament.

Alan Whitehead may also refer to:
 Alan Whitehead (cricketer) (born 1940), English cricketer and umpire
 Alan Whitehead (drummer) (born 1945), drummer with the 1960s band Marmalade
 Alan Whitehead (footballer, born 1951), English football defender for Birmingham City in the early 1970s
 Alan Whitehead (footballer, born 1956), English football defender for clubs including Bury, Brentford and Scunthorpe United in the late 1970s and 1980s